Daniel Altmaier was the defending champion but chose not to defend his title.

Hamad Međedović won the title after defeating Zhang Zhizhen 6–1, 6–2 in the final.

Seeds

Draw

Finals

Top half

Bottom half

References

External links
Main draw
Qualifying draw

Platzmann-Sauerland Open - 1